The Legislative Duma of Khabarovsk Krai is the regional parliament of Khabarovsk Krai, a federal subject of Russia.

The Duma consists of 36 deputies elected for a term of five years. 24 deputies are elected by single-member constituencies and another 12 deputies are elected in party lists.

History
Elections were last held on 8 September 2019. Governor Sergei Furgal's party, LDPR, won by a landslide in the election, gaining 27 seats (30 total) and therefore a supermajority, while the ruling party, United Russia, lost 28 seats and its supermajority.

In December 2019, a LDPR deputy was elected senator to the Federation Council. In June 2020, LDPR deputy Vyacheslav Furgal, the brother of Sergei Furgal, died in June 2020 due to COVID-19.

By-elections were held on 13 September 2020.

Elections

2014

2019

Chairpersons

References 

Politics of Khabarovsk Krai
Khabarovsk Krai